Valerie Dean O'Loughlin is Professor of Anatomy and Cell Biology at the Indiana University School of Medicine, Bloomington, co-author of two anatomy textbooks, now in their 3rd and 5th editions, and a Fellow of the American Association of Anatomists.

Career 
O'Loughlin studied anthropology and physics at the College of William and Mary, and earned a PhD in biological anthropology from Indiana University. She serves as Assistant Director of Undergraduate Education for the Medical Sciences Program and oversees the Education Track in Anatomy PhD program at Indiana University Bloomington.  She teaches undergraduate, graduate and medical students at Indiana University Bloomington and has received national recognition for her teaching, including the American Association of Anatomists 2018 Henry Gray Distinguished Educator Award.  She is a Fellow of the American Association of Anatomists (AAA), President-Emeritus of the Human Anatomy and Physiology Society (HAPS), and is a co-author of two undergraduate textbooks:  McKinley/O'Loughlin/Harris, Human Anatomy (5th edition), and McKinley/O'Loughlin/Bidle, Anatomy and Physiology: An Integrative Approach (3rd edition).

References 

American women biologists
Living people
Year of birth missing (living people)
21st-century American women